Bhimadole mandal is one of the 28 mandals in Eluru district of the Indian state of Andhra Pradesh. It is administered under Eluru revenue division and its headquarters are located at Bhimadole.

Demographics

As of 2011 census Bhimadole mandal has a population of

Towns and villages 

 census, the mandal has 11 settlements. Bhimadole is the most populated and Mallavaram is the least populated village in the mandal.

The settlements in the mandal are listed below:

See also 
Eluru district

References

Mandals in Eluru district